Liverpool St James station in Liverpool, England, was a railway station situated on the old Cheshire Lines Committee line from  between Central and   stations. This line is now a part of Merseyrail's Northern Line. The station is located in a deep cutting between two tunnels at the junction of Parliament Street and St. James' Place, opposite St James' Church.

There are plans in place by Merseytravel and the Liverpool City Region Combined Authority to reopen the station. Work is set to start in April 2024, lasting around three years.

History
The station opened on 1 March 1874 and closed on 1 January 1917.

In 1913 six people lost their lives in an accident at the station when a train ran into the back of a train standing at the southbound platform.

Parts of the station's platforms survive, as do some rooms cut into the rockface.

21st century
The station site's proximity to the M&S Bank Arena, Anglican Cathedral, King's Waterfront, Cains Brewery Village and other more recent developments in the surrounding area has focused public attention on reopening it.

2010s
In 2012, Liverpool's Strategic Investment Framework listed the reopening of St James as important to the success of the Baltic Triangle development. Merseytravel agreed to work with Liverpool Vision in March 2014 to investigate the cost of reopening the station and its projected usage. In January 2015 Merseytravel confirmed that they would be carrying out a study for the station's potential reopening in the 201516 financial year. Merseyrail listed the re-opening of the station as a 'top rail project' during a presentation on rail development and delivery in November 2016.

Merseytravel commissioned a report into the reopening of the station which was completed in September 2017. The report compared reopening St James against the construction of a new station in the Chinatown area of Liverpool. While the report found many benefits to opening a station in the Chinatown area, it concluded that: "A new station at St James is feasible and potentially highly beneficial, albeit at a high cost and with correspondingly reduced value for money." Merseytravel's chairman Liam Robinson stated in an interview with the Liverpool Echo in February 2019 that reopening the station would be a significant task and would involve the construction of new platforms, ticket offices, waiting areas and lift shafts.

Liverpool City Region Combined Authority announced in August 2019 that they were planning to use part of a £172million funding package to reopen the station, subject to the plans being approved.

2020s
In October 2020, it was announced that £1.2million of these funds were to be used to commission Network Rail to complete the next stage of design work for the reopening project. A further £300,000 of these funds had been used to purchase a plot of land adjacent to the station site upon which the Combined Authority hopes a future ticket office might be constructed. In 2020, the Combined Authority applied for additional funding for the reopening project from the third round of the Department for Transport's New Stations Fund.
A public vote was put forward in January 2022 by Merseytravel and the Liverpool City Region Combined Authority, to choose a name for the station when it reopens. Officials felt that the existing name for the station would cause confusion with James Street station. The public were asked to choose a new name from:
 Liverpool Baltic
 Liverpool Parliament Street
 Liverpool Riverside
On  12 April 2022, the results of the vote were announced, with 77.7% of the public voting for Liverpool Baltic as the name of the new station.

References

Sources

External links
 The station on a navigable Edwardian OS 6" map, via National Library of Scotland
 The station and line via Rail Map Online
 Entry on Disused Stations

Disused railway stations in Liverpool
Former Cheshire Lines Committee stations
Railway stations in Great Britain opened in 1874
Railway stations in Great Britain closed in 1917
Proposed railway stations in Merseyside